Pagurus ikedai, the hermit crabs, is a species of right-handed hermit crab in the family Paguridae.

References

Further reading

 

Decapods
Articles created by Qbugbot
Crustaceans described in 2005